Serhan Poçan (1970) is a Turkish mountaineer and a summiter of Mount Everest.

He was born on April 11, 1970 in Konya, Turkey. Serhan graduated Middle East Technical University, Ankara with a BS degree in Mathematics. Currently, he is working as a software expert.

He was the leader of the first Turkish expedition to climb Mount Everest, a team of six men and four women, who all reached the summit. Serhan made the summit with five other members on the second attempt of the team on May 24, 2006.

He is married to Burçak Özoğlu, a mountaineer colleague of him, who was also on the peak of Mt. Everest along with him on the same day.

References

1970 births
Sportspeople from Konya
Middle East Technical University alumni
Turkish mountain climbers
Turkish summiters of Mount Everest
Living people